The Sheriff of Ross, Cromarty and Sutherland was historically the office responsible for enforcing law and order in Ross-shire, Cromarty and Sutherland, Scotland and bringing criminals to justice.

Original known as the office of the Sheriff of Cromarty it became known, following mergers of the Scottish sheriffdoms, as the Sheriff of Ross & Cromarty in 1747 and the Sheriff of Ross, Cromarty & Sutherland in 1870. Following  a further merger in 1946 it became the Sheriff of Inverness, Moray, Nairn & Ross & Cromarty.

Sheriffs of Cromarty 

The position of the sheriff of Cromarty was a heritable position. 
William de Monte Alto (1266)
William de Monte Alto (1296-1304), (1305-?)
William III, Earl of Ross (c. 1345)
Adam Urquhart (1365)
William Urquhart (c.1470)
Alexander Urquhart (1497)

Sheriffs of Ross
1493: Hugh Ross of Balnagowan
1499: David Ross of Balnagowan
1706–1722: Hugh Rose of Kilravock 
1725–1729: Sir Robert Munro of Foulis 
1729–1732: Hugh Rose, 15th of Kilravock
1732–1734: Hugh Rose, Master of Kilravock

Sheriffs of Ross and Cromarty (1747)
1747–1772: Hugh Rose of Geddes 
1773–1774: William Mackenzie of Balmaduthy 
1774–1833: Donald Macleod of Geanies 
1835–1850: John Jardine 
1850–1851: George Deas
1851–1855: Thomas Mackenzie
1855–1859: George Moir
1859–1869: Alexander Shank Cook 
1869–1870: Alexander Moncrieff

Sheriffs of Ross, Cromarty and Sutherland (1870)
1870–1874: George Dingwall Fordyce 
1875–1876: John Macdonald
1877–1881: John Pettigrew Wilson  
1881–1886: William Mackintosh  
1886–1889: John Cheyne, KC 
1889–1890: Alexander Low
1890–1891: Andrew Jameson, Lord Ardwall   (Sheriff of Perth, 1891)
1891–1898: Henry Johnston  (Sheriff of Angus, 1898–1905)
1898–1900: William Charles Smith, KC 
1900-1907: Charles John Guthrie, KC 
1907–1912: John Alexander Reid, KC 
1912–1940: James Mackintosh, KC 
1946: Ross and Cromarty merged into the new sheriffdom of Inverness, Moray, Nairn & Ross & Cromarty. Sutherland merged into Sheriffdom of Caithness, Sutherland, Orkney & Zetland

See also
 Historical development of Scottish sheriffdoms

References

Sutherland
Ross and Cromarty